Red Dike Bluff is a prominent bluff immediately south of Trepidation Glacier on the east side of the Skelton Glacier. The bluff is distinguished by a dike consisting of igneous rock against a black background of the intruded sediments. The descriptive name was given in 1957 by the New Zealand party of the Commonwealth Trans-Antarctic Expedition, 1956–58.
 

Cliffs of the Ross Dependency
Hillary Coast